Conus cebuensis is a species of sea snail, a marine gastropod mollusk in the family Conidae and the order Neogastropoda. They are otherwise known as cone snails, cone shells or cones.

They usually inhabit the neritic zone, in the shallow part, between depths of 25 meters and 250 meters. These snails, like other members of the Conidae family are predatory and venomous. They are also capable of "stinging" humans.

Description
This snail has been reported to be between 25 mm and 45 mm in length.

Distribution
These marine species are found in the oceans of the New Caledonia region, specifically near Philippines, Indonesia, Papua New Guinea and Fiji.

References

 Filmer R.M. (2001). A Catalogue of Nomenclature and Taxonomy in the Living Conidae 1758 - 1998. Backhuys Publishers, Leiden. 388pp
 Puillandre N., Duda T.F., Meyer C., Olivera B.M. & Bouchet P. (2015). One, four or 100 genera? A new classification of the cone snails. Journal of Molluscan Studies. 81: 1-23

External links
 To World Register of Marine Species
 Cone Shells - Knights of the Sea
 

cebuensis
Fauna of Cebu
Gastropods described in 1990